The Yon is a  long river in the Vendée département, western France. Its source is at Saint-Martin-des-Noyers. It flows generally south. It is a right tributary of the Lay into which it flows between Rosnay and Le Champ-Saint-Père.

Communes along its course
This list is ordered from source to mouth: 
Vendée: Saint-Martin-des-Noyers, La Chaize-le-Vicomte, La Ferrière, Dompierre-sur-Yon, La Roche-sur-Yon, Nesmy, Saint-Florent-des-Bois, Chaillé-sous-les-Ormeaux, Le Tablier, Rosnay, Le Champ-Saint-Père

References

Rivers of France
Rivers of Vendée
Rivers of Pays de la Loire